The 2900 Block Grove Avenue Historic District is a national historic district located at Richmond, Virginia. The district encompasses five contributing buildings including three Queen Anne style houses and a square house with Mission/Spanish Revival decorative details. The houses were built between the late-1890s and 1912. Also included is a row of wooden carriage houses with cupolas and gingerbread scroll work.

It was added to the National Register of Historic Places in 1973.

References

Historic districts on the National Register of Historic Places in Virginia
Mission Revival architecture in Virginia
Queen Anne architecture in Virginia
Houses in Richmond, Virginia
National Register of Historic Places in Richmond, Virginia